Magic of Love may refer to

 Magic of Love (album), a 1999 album by Zhao Wei
 "Magic of Love" (song), a 2013 song by Perfume
 "Magic of Love", a 1960 song by Johnny Kidd & the Pirates 
 "Magic of Love", a song by Big Brother and the Holding Company from Farewell Song
 "Magic of Love", a 1986 song by Sheena Easton
 "Magic of Love", a 1999 song by Taiyō to Ciscomoon
 The Magic of Love,  1977 novel by Barbara Cartland